Patersonia pygmaea is a species of plant in the iris family Iridaceae and is endemic to the south-west of Western Australia. It is a tufted, rhizome-forming perennial herb with sword-shaped leaves and bluish-violet to purple tepals.

Description

Taxonomy and naming
Patersonia pygmaea was first described in 1840 by John Lindley in A Sketch of the Vegetation of the Swan River Colony. The specific epithet (pygmaea) means "dwarf".

Distribution and habitat
This patersonia grows in forest and heathland from the Darling Range to the Stirling Range and Albany.

Conservation status
Patersonia pygmaea is classified as "not threatened" by the Western Australian Government Department of Biodiversity, Conservation and Attractions.

References

pygmaea
Flora of Western Australia
Plants described in 1840
Taxa named by John Lindley